|}

The Prix du Conseil de Paris is a Group 2 flat horse race in France open to thoroughbreds aged three years or older. It is run at Longchamp over a distance of 2,400 metres (about  miles), and it is scheduled to take place each year in October.

History
The event was established in 1893, and it was originally called the Prix du Conseil Municipal. It was funded by Paris Municipal Council, which had recently signed a new leasehold of Longchamp Racecourse.

The Prix du Conseil Municipal was the second major international race introduced by the Société d'Encouragement. The first, the Grand Prix de Paris, had been launched thirty years earlier. Unlike that event, which was restricted to three-year-olds, the new race was open to horses aged three or older. The basic weights to be carried were 53 kg for three-year-olds and 58 kg for their elders. A penalty of up to 6 kg could be incurred for previous performances.

With an initial prize of 100,000 francs, the Prix du Conseil Municipal was France's second richest race after the Grand Prix de Paris. Prior to the creation of the Prix de l'Arc de Triomphe, it was the most prestigious event of Longchamp's autumn schedule.

Before World War I, the race regularly featured horses trained outside France. Three British horses were successful during this period. The event was abandoned throughout the war, with no running from 1914 to 1918. The Prix de l'Arc de Triomphe was introduced in 1920, and from this point the Prix du Conseil Municipal took place a week later. The interval was increased to a fortnight in 1925.

The race was cancelled once during World War II, in 1939. It was run at Auteuil over 2,600 metres in 1940, and at Le Tremblay over 2,300 metres in 1943 and 1944.

The present system of race grading was introduced in 1971, and the Prix du Conseil Municipal was classed at Group 2 level. It was renamed the Prix du Conseil de Paris in 1974, after reforms to the statutes of Paris.

Records
Most successful horse (2 wins):
 Omnium II – 1895, 1896
 La Camargo – 1902, 1903
 Porphyros – 1940, 1942
 Kamaraan – 1974, 1975
 Montare – 2005, 2007

Leading jockey (4 wins):
 Rae Johnstone – Assuerus (1933), Vandale (1946), Espace Vital (1948), Worden (1952)
 Yves Saint-Martin – Zamazaan (1968), Recupere (1973), Sagace (1983), Lashkari (1984)

Leading trainer (8 wins):
 André Fabre – Village Star (1987), Sunshack (1994), De Quest (1995), First Magnitude (1999), Crimson Quest (2000), Crossharbour (2008), Prince Bishop (2010), Manatee (2014)

Leading owner (7 wins):
 HH Aga Khan IV – Zamazaan (1968), Kamaraan (1974, 1975), Lashkari (1984), Altayan (1986), Daramsar (2006), Vadamar (2011)

Winners since 1978

Earlier winners

 1893: Callistrate
 1894: Best Man
 1895: Omnium II
 1896: Omnium II
 1897: Winkfield's Pride
 1898: Gardefeu
 1899: Libaros
 1900: Codoman
 1901: Kilmarnock
 1902: La Camargo
 1903: La Camargo
 1904: Presto
 1905: Macdonald II
 1906: Maintenon
 1907: Luzerne
 1908: Biniou
 1909: Hag to Hag
 1910: Ossian
 1911: Basse Pointe
 1912: Shannon
 1913: Nimbus
 1914–18: no race
 1919: Loisir
 1920: Meddlesome Maid
 1921: Flechois
 1922: Le Prodige
 1923: Dauphin
 1924: Tricard
 1925: Nid d'Or
 1926: Olibrius
 1927: Cerulea
 1928: Balmoral
 1929: Motrico
 1930: Erodion
 1931: Sans Ame
 1932: Macaroni
 1933: Assuerus
 1934: Cadmus
 1935: Come In
 1936: Cousine
 1937: Sanguinetto
 1938: Nica
 1939: no race
 1940: Porphyros
 1941: Horatius
 1942: Porphyros
 1943: Royalhunter
 1944: Galene
 1945: Basileus
 1946: Vandale
 1947: Goyama
 1948: Espace Vital
 1949: Vela
 1950: Violoncelle
 1951:
 1952: Worden
 1953: Savoyard
 1954: Clochard
 1955: Mahan
 1956: Arcadius
 1957: Thila
 1958: Tombeur
 1959: Blue Net
 1960: Astana
 1961: Carteret
 1962: Arcor
 1963: Nyrcos
 1964: Timmy Lad
 1965: Hammam
 1966: Pasquin
 1967: Bagdad
 1968: Zamazaan
 1969: Karabas
 1970: Armos
 1971: Ex Libris
 1972: Monsieur D
 1973: Recupere
 1974: Kamaraan
 1975: Kamaraan
 1976: On My Way
 1977: Monseigneur

See also
 List of French flat horse races
 Recurring sporting events established in 1893 – this race is included under its original title, Prix du Conseil Municipal.

References
 France Galop / Racing Post:

 galop.courses-france.com:
 1893–1919, 1920–1949, 1950–1979, 1980–present
 france-galop.com – A Brief History: Prix du Conseil de Paris.
 galopp-sieger.de – Prix du Conseil de Paris (ex Prix du Conseil Municipal).
 horseracingintfed.com – International Federation of Horseracing Authorities – Prix du Conseil de Paris (2016).
 pedigreequery.com – Prix du Conseil de Paris – Longchamp.

Open middle distance horse races
Longchamp Racecourse
Horse races in France